Caldisalinibacter kiritimatiensis  is a moderately thermohalophilic bacterium from the genus of Caldisalinibacter which has been isolated from the anoxic zone from Kiritimati Atoll.

References

External links 

Type strain of Caldisalinibacter kiritimatiensis at BacDive -  the Bacterial Diversity Metadatabase

Clostridiaceae
Bacteria described in 2015